KGQ or kgq may refer to:

 Kamoro language (ISO 639-3 language code kgq), an Asmat-Kamoro language spoken in New Guinea
 Kangersuatsiaq Heliport (IATA code KGQ), a heliport in Kangersuatsiaq, Greenland
 Kasaragod railway station (Indian Railways station code KGQ), Kerala, India